Jago Bay is a Canadian Arctic waterway in the Northwest Territories.  It is an eastern arm of Amundsen Gulf, north of Walker Bay, and its mouth is west of Fort Collinson.

Bays of the Northwest Territories